= Margarida Ribeiro =

Portuguese anthropologist

Margarida Rosa Cassola Ribeiro (15 November 1911 - 6 May 2001) was a Portuguese anthropologist who did studies of the Portuguese Colonial Wars. She also worked in museums beginning in the 1940s.
